BSJ is an acronym that can stand for:

Bairnsdale Airport
Ballet San Jose, formerly Ballet San Jose Silicon Valley 
Bibliothèque Saint-Jean
Bachelor of Science, Journalism
Bedford St Johns railway station
Benjamin St-Juste (born 1997), Canadian player of American football
Boy Scouts of Japan, a former name of the Scout Association of Japan
Berkeley Scientific Journal, the undergraduate science journal of the University of California, Berkeley
Baby Surprise Jacket, a knitted item created by Elizabeth Zimmermann